Clube Atlético Pêro Pinheiro is a Portuguese sports club from Pêro Pinheiro, Sintra.

The men's football team plays in the Campeonato de Portugal, the fourth tier of Portuguese football. Pêro Pinheiro also had a stint on the former fourth tier, competing in the 2011–12 and 2012–13 Terceira Divisão. Later, the team won promotion to the 2017–18 Campeonato de Portugal after winning the AF Lisboa Pró-Nacional in 2016–17. The Campeonato de Portugal was the third tier until 2021, when it dropped to being the fourth tier.

References

Football clubs in Portugal
Association football clubs established in 1945
1945 establishments in Portugal
Sport in Sintra